Oleksander Lototsky was a Ukrainian statesman, diplomat, writer, and scientist. He was a member of the Association of the Ukrainian Progressionists (TUP).

Lototsky graduated from the Kiev Theological Academy in 1896. In 1900-17 he worked in the office of state controller in Kiev and Saint Petersburg. During World War I Lototsky served as a gubernatorial commissar of Bukovina and Pokuttia. In 1917 he also one of organizers of the Ukrainian National Council in Saint Petersburg.

Lototsky had a daughter Oksana who married Ivan-Stepan Tokarzhevsky.

External links
 Biography at izbornik
 Biography at historic portal of Kamyanets Podilsky

1870 births
1939 deaths
People from Vinnytsia Oblast
People from Mogilyovsky Uyezd (Podolian Governorate)
Ukrainian Democratic Party (1904) politicians
Politicians of the Russian Empire
Interior ministers of Ukraine
Members of the Ukrainian government in exile
State controllers of Ukraine
Members of the Central Council of Ukraine
Ambassadors of Ukraine to Turkey
Writers from the Russian Empire
Kiev Theological Academy alumni